Loved Up is a BBC drama, first shown on TV on 23 September 1995 on the BBC 2 Originally this was a school information film for teenagers to show the risks of taking ecstasy, first shown to schoolchildren in the UK in 1992 and part of the Love Bites series. The film was directed by Peter Cattaneo, who would go on to direct the feature films The Full Monty (1997) and Lucky Break (2001). Starring Lena Headey, Ian Hart and Jason Isaacs, it includes an early appearance by Danny Dyer, who subsequently starred in the 1999 film, Human Traffic, which explored similar themes of clubbing and drug culture. The drama is notable for being the first collaboration between BBC Drama Screen Two ( BBC Two ) and Scene (BBC Education) with series associate producer Andy Rowley. Loved Up won a BAFTA award as Best Children's Drama in 1996

Story
The story revolves around Tom, played by Ian Hart, who meets Sarah (Lena Headey) in the cafe in which she works. She is quickly swept up in Tom's  lifestyle, where she finds escape from her traumatic family life.

The film follows her path into the world of clubbing and ecstasy, her personal relationship with Tom, and her growing family pressures. The film culminates with Sarah's mother's drinking problem leading to an attempted suicide, and Sarah asking Tom for help by leaving him a vague answerphone message he does not actually receive in time to be able to do anything. Sarah ends her relationship with Tom, and the film finishes with Tom dropping another pill, and dancing his troubles away.

Production
A 2 x 30 minute abridged version of the story (the original screening was 70 minutes) was screened as part of the BBC Schools Scene series in October 1995, and subsequently repeated a number of times.

Soundtrack
A soundtrack to accompany the film was also produced and featured artists such as The Prodigy, Orbital and Leftfield.

Loved Up (original release)
The first release of the soundtrack was 1 CD and according to www.amazon.co.uk has the following track listing (note that Plastic Dream should be Plastic Dreams): This Cd was compiled by Peter Whelan & Brian Monaghan AKA Flystyle & Mello in Node recording studios on SADIE 
digital editing system.

(Title / Artist)
 Smoke Belch II - Sabres Of Paradise
 Crystal Clear - Grid
 Prologue - 10th Chapter
 Two Full Moons And A Trout - Union Jack
 Little Bullet - Spooky
 Gut Drum Mix - Funtopia
 Plastic Dream - Jaydee
 Break And Enter - Prodigy
 Acperience - Hardfloor
 Surjestive - Advances
 Melt - Leftfield

Totally Loved Up
The soundtrack was re-released as Totally Loved Up with an additional CD, and on vinyl, containing more music from the film. Discogs (www.discogs.com) has the track listing as follows:

CD1
(Artist / Title)
01 Grid, The  - Crystal Clear 4:31 
02 Bedrock  - For What You Dream Of 6:43
03 Funtopia  - Do You Wanna Know (Gut Drum Mix) 6:02 
04 Hardfloor  - Acperience 8:04
05 Union Jack  - Two Full Moons And A Trout 7:05 
06 Orbital  - Attached 12:12
07 Rebound  - Make It Funky 7:38
08 Surjestive  - Advances 4:55
09 Spooky  - Little Bullet Part 1 7:28 
10 Leftfield  - Melt 4:27

CD2
(Artist / Title)
01 Richard Kirk  - Oneski 5:31
02 Tenth Chapter  - Prologue 6:30
03 Grid, The  - Shapes Of Sleep 6:06
04 Union Jack  - Lollipop Man 6:21
05 Prodigy, The  - Full Throttle 4:48
06 A Zone  - Calling The People 5:26
07 Banco de Gaia  - Soufie 6:42
08 Jaydee  - Plastic Dreams 10:05
09 Leftfield  - Song Of Life 7:10
10 Orbital  - Forever 7:56
11 Sabres Of Paradise  - Smokebelch 2 (Beatless Mix) 4:16

Vinyl

Released as a triple record set (catalog number PRIMA LP 2), with the following track listing:

Record A Side 1
- Sabres Of Paradise  - Smokebelch 11 (Beatless Mix) 4.14
- Prodigy, The - Break and Enter 8.24
Record A Side 2
- Suggestive - Advances 5.46
- Spooky - Little Bullet Part 1 8.10
Record B Side 1
- Grid, The  - Crystal Clear 4:36
- Hardfloor  - Acperience 9.00
Record B Side 2
- Union Jack  - Two Full Moons And A Trout 7.46
- Leftfield - Melt 5.11
Record C Side 1
- Bedrock - For What You Dream Of 7.25
- Jaydee - Plastic Dreams 5.24
Record C Side 2
- 10th Chapter - Prologue 6.52
- Funtopia - Gut Drum Mix 6.22

Video release
The film was released on VHS in 1999, but is now deleted. As of June 2013, it has not been released on DVD.

Cast 
 Sarah - Lena Headey
 Tom - Ian Hart
 Danny - Charlie Creed-Miles
 Dez 1 - Clarence Smith
 Ruth - Linda Bassett
 Karen - Milly Gregory
 Dez 2 - Jason Isaacs
 Cocker - Rick Warden
 Ifti - Andrew Rajan
 Donna - Sheila Whitfield
 Ray - Philip Glenister
 Cab driver - Trevor Cooper
 Nigel - Charles Edwards
 Billy - Danny Dyer
 Pat - Claire Sabre
 Ron - David Aldous
 First PC - Luke Williams
 Second PC - Chris Jenkinson
 Dozing raver - Gavin Hills

References

External links 
Loved Up - BFI ScreenOnline

BBC television dramas
British television films
1995 television films
1995 films